Shenayez (also Romanized as Shenāyez; also known as Shenā’ez and Shenā’īz) is a village in Mahmeleh Rural District, Mahmeleh District, Khonj County, Fars Province, Iran. At the 2006 census, its population was 43, in 11 families.

References 

Populated places in Khonj County